Bonfouca (also Bonfonca, Boucffouca, Bouefuka, Boukfouca)  is an unincorporated community in St. Tammany Parish, Louisiana, United States. It is on Louisiana Highway 433 adjacent to Liberty Bayou two miles west of Slidell.

Etymology
It is speculated that the name derives from the Choctaw words bok meaning river and fuka meaning home or residence in the Choctaw language. The name Bokfuka was given to a Choctaw chief that attacked the German Coast of Louisiana in the year 1747. Then in the year 1802 Louis-Narcisse Baudry Des Lozieres documents the name of the tribe and used the French transliteration of Bonifoucas.

Notes

Unincorporated communities in St. Tammany Parish, Louisiana
Unincorporated communities in Louisiana